Vesalea is a plant genus in the honeysuckle family Caprifoliaceae. They are native to Mexico.

The genus was circumscribed by Martin Martens and Henri Guillaume Galeotti in Bull. Acad. Roy. Sci. Bruxelles vol.11 (1) on page 242 in 1844.

The genus name of Vesalea is in honour of Andreas Vesalius (1514–1564), who was a Belgian anatomist and physician. He was a professor at the University of Padua (1537–1542) and later became Imperial physician at the court of Emperor Charles V.

Species
As accepted by Plants of the World Online (POWO);

References

External links
 
 

Caprifoliaceae
Flora of Mexico
Caprifoliaceae genera